Annovka is a rural locality (a village) in Leninsky Selsoviet, Kuyurgazinsky District, Bashkortostan, Russia. The population was 1 as of 2010. There is 1 street.

Geography 
Annovka is located 30 km northeast of Yermolayevo (the district's administrative centre) by road. Balza is the nearest rural locality.

References 

Rural localities in Kuyurgazinsky District